Champagne Landing or Champagne Landing 10 is a First Nations settlement in  Yukon, Canada. It is located on the Alaska Highway (historical mile 968, between Whitehorse and Haines Junction). Its residents are citizens of the Champagne and Aishihik First Nations.

History 
Champagne is on the Dezadeash River, one of the tributaries of the Alsek. The original Dalton Trail connected to this settlement, and a roadhouse was built there in 1902. The Alaska highway no longer routes through the community, having been rerouted in the fall of 2002. The old roadway is still open to provide access. Many residents have moved to Haines Junction, where their nation has more services available.

Demographics 

References

External links

Champagne and Aishihik First Nations web site

Indian settlements in Yukon
Southern Tutchone